Abburu may refer to many villages in India:

Places

Andhra Pradesh 
Abburu, Andhra Pradesh in Sattenapalle

Karnataka 
Abbur Machagowdanahalli
Abburu, Hunsur taluk
Abburu, Krishnarajanagara taluk
Abbur, Bangalore Rural
Abbur, Piriyapatna taluk

People 
Abburi Chayadevi
Abburi Ravi